Just an Old Sweet Song is a 1976 novel by Melvin Van Peebles. It was later adapted as a made-for-television film which starred Robert Hooks and Cicely Tyson.

References

 

Novels by Melvin Van Peebles
1976 American novels
African-American novels